Gregory Sica (born 11 March 1983 in Perth, Western Australia) is an Australian sports writer, who currently writes for Sports Illustrated. He works as the South American correspondent providing analysis on soccer throughout the continent since moving to Uruguay in February 2005.

He is well known at SI.com for his exclusive interviews, after having interviewed some of South America's top soccer players, most notably those from Argentina, Brazil and Uruguay. These have included Diego Forlán, Luís Fabiano, Hernán Crespo, Álvaro Recoba, Gabriel Heinze, Gonzalo Higuaín, Daniel Alves, Diego Lugano, Rodrigo Palacio, and Guillermo Barros Schelotto.

One of his most controversial pieces for Sports Illustrated was about the serious and unpleasant effects of Hooliganism, on Argentine soccer.

He also provides commentary on several important international competitions, such as the FIFA World Cup, the Copa América, The FIFA Club World Cup, The Copa Libertadores, and the Copa Sudamericana. He often includes his predictions for these tournaments.

Sica graduated from Edith Cowan University in 2004, where he majored in both journalism and advertising.

He decided to take up a career in journalism, after a serious injury put his soccer career to an end at the age of 19. He was an attacking midfielder for the youth team of Perth Glory, an A-League Australian soccer team.

External links
 Gregory Sica Sports Illustrated Archive

Australian sportswriters
Writers from Perth, Western Australia
1983 births
Living people